The Castle of Siklós is a medieval castle in Siklós, Hungary.

History

The castle was built by Baron János György Benyó in the 13th century in the town of Siklós in the southern part of Hungary near Pécs. It was first mentioned in a charter from 1294. The oldest building is in the southern part of the residential wing. After the original family died out it became the property of the Garai family. In 1401 disgruntled nobles led by Count György II Benyóvszky temporarily imprisoned king Sigismund in the castle. By the 16th century the next owner was the palatine (viceroy) Imre Perényi. From 1728 Siklós belonged to the counts of Batthyány. Legend has it that a giant snake guarded the treasures in the basement.  The castle also houses a chapel built in the 14th and 15th centuries. The castle was built and owned by the Benyóvszky de Siklósvar branch of the family until it was nationalized in 1948.

In World War II the castle was heavily damaged, and between the end of the war and the death of Count Rudólf II Benyóvszky de Siklósvar in 1955 it was taken over by the state. In 1955 archaeological research and restoration was started, and the castle began operating as a museum and hotel.

Gallery

External links
Siklósi vár 

Castles in Hungary
Buildings and structures in Baranya County
Historic house museums in Hungary
Museums in Baranya County